Raphael Bousso (born 1971) is a theoretical physicist and cosmologist. He is a professor at the Berkeley Center for Theoretical Physics in the Department of Physics, UC Berkeley. He is known for the Bousso bound on the information content of the universe. With Joseph Polchinski, Bousso proposed the string theory landscape as a solution to the cosmological constant problem.

Life and career
Bousso was born in Haifa, Israel, the son of late scientist Dino Bousso. He grew up near Augsburg, Germany, where he studied physics from 1990 until 1993. Bousso earned his Ph.D. at Cambridge University in 1997; his doctoral advisor was Stephen Hawking. Bousso did postdoctoral research at Stanford University until 2000, and at the Kavli Institute for Theoretical Physics in Santa Barbara until 2002. In 2002/03, Bousso was a fellow at the Harvard University physics department and the Radcliffe Institute for Advanced Study. Since 2002, he has been a professor in the physics department at the University of California, Berkeley. In 2012, Bousso was elected Fellow of the American Physical Society "for fundamental discoveries in the field of quantum cosmology, including the covariant entropy bound and the string landscape."

Research
Bousso's research is focused on quantum gravity and cosmology, particularly through the study of quantum information. His 1999 covariant entropy bound (Bousso bound) established a general relation between quantum information and the geometry of spacetime (i.e., gravity). The Bousso bound has since been refined and strengthened, leading to provable new results in quantum field theory, such as the quantum null energy condition. Bousso has also worked on the black hole information paradox (firewall problem). Since 2018, he has led a consortium of theoretical and experimental physicists exploring and developing the relations between quantum gravity, quantum information, and quantum computing.

In 2000, Bousso and Joseph Polchinski argued that string theory has many long-lived vacua, including solutions compatible with the observed positive value of the cosmological constant (vacuum energy). This came to be called the "landscape of string theory." Bousso has developed an approach to the cosmological measure problem, with the ultimate goal of testing the string theory landscape.

References

External links 

 Bousso Group 
 Faculty page at the UC Berkeley Department of Physics
 Lectures at the Arnold Sommerfeld School, LMU Munich, 2018
 List of publications on Inspire
 Bousso at the World Science Festival
 Interviews at Closer to Truth

Living people
Theoretical physicists
Cosmologists
String theorists
1971 births
Fellows of the American Physical Society
University of California, Berkeley College of Letters and Science faculty
20th-century German physicists